Hungarian Slovak Gypsies immigrated to the United States in the late 19th century, many from (Sáros in Hungary and Zemplín counties) Košice, Slovakia. They settled in the cities of Braddock, Homestead, Johnstown, and Uniontown, Pennsylvania; Cleveland and Youngstown, Ohio; Detroit and Delray, Michigan; Gary, Indiana; Chicago, and New York City. The Hungarian Slovak Gypsies were a community of settled Roma, and in the United States were well known for playing music for the Central European immigrant communities in which they settled. These Roma were known for playing in cafes and restaurants, the name associating these Romani as Bashaldé was made up in late 20th century, and in Hungary they are called Romungro Romani; portions of them were also known as Romungre. In the early 1900s the Roma in Braddock, Pennsylvania, purchased an entire block of homes, making them the largest population of settled Roma in the United States.

The Hungarian Gypsy Orchestra consist of a lead violin referred to as a Primas, a second violin or viola, tenor violin, bass fiddle and a cimbalom.
Their music was an important part of world roots music, and they performed throughout America in Hungarian music and all genres of music. In 1887, the first of these Roma immigrated to America, they brought to America the traditional Hungarian Gypsy music they and their ancestors played in Europe for hundreds of years. These Gypsy musicians were descendants of famous Gypsy orchestras such as János Bihari, whose descendants today are the Lakatos family; female Gypsy violinist Czinka Panna; Pista Dankó; Rigó Jancsi; Imre Magyari; and Racz Laci. They created the Csárdás, which influenced such composers as Joseph Haydn; Franz Liszt, who wrote fifteen Hungarian rhapsodies; Johannes Brahms, who wrote twenty-one Hungarian dances; Antonín Dvořák; Pablo de Sarasate, who wrote Zigeunerweisen; Georges Bizet, who wrote Carmen; and Maurice Ravel, who wrote Tzigane.

By 1920, Cleveland had the largest population of Hungarians in America, second to Budapest. Cleveland Hungarians held hundreds of events every year and the Gypsies were the entertainment for all of these events. Detroit's Delray district had many Hungarian restaurants such as the Hungarian Village, where as many as four cimbaloms would be set up to play, and in Braddock, Pennsylvania, journalists from all over the world were writing about them. These Hungarian Gypsy musicians played all the major Hungarian events, and many American events for over 100 years, and in the finest restaurants in the country. They also played many weddings and special occasions, including movies. For over 100 years, newspaper articles, books, and journals documented them and their traditions. One tradition is the Hungarian Gypsy funeral were as many as fifty to seventy-five musicians would play for the deceased in a funeral procession. Many of the funerals news reporters covered went through the Associated Press in newspapers all over the world.  The best known Primas' (lead violin) came from this group such as Joska Rabb, Ernie Kiraly, Max Bandy, Kal Bandy, Maxie Rigo, Martze Ballog, William Garber, John Brenkacs, Louis Ballog, Albert Balog, Geza Duna, Rudy Rigo, Emery Deutsch, Frank Richko, Maxie Fransko, Rudy Balog, Rudy Ziga, Arthur Rakoczi, Gusty Horvath, Alex Udvary, George Batyi, Tony Ballog,  Billy Rose, Martze Ballog, Willie Horvath, Bill Yedla, Albert Duna, Albert Horvath, and Bella (Bendy) Ballog.

The Gypsy Countess Verona, was one of the most famous of these Hungarian Slovak Gypsies. She married the Count Dean Szechy de Szechy Favla, of Budapest. She was one of the greatest cimbalom players in the world; she toured the world, made records and wrote music.

In 1924, Henry Ford, in an effort to get the young people away from jazz and back into the old music, started his Old Fashion Dance Band. Musicians from all over the world auditioned  for a spot in the band.  The cimbalom player was a Hungarian Gypsy from Braddock, William Hallup. They made records, traveled the world and played at all Ford's events. His cimbalom is in the Henry Ford Museum.

Notable people
 Elek Bacsik (1926–1993), jazz guitarist and violinist
 Ian Hancock (b. 1942), linguist

References

Bibliography
Harvard University Study on Roma with all Roma experts including Steve Piskor. Tells you about the world "Gypsy" and Hungarian Slovak Gypsies.  An 80 page published study.
Romani Realities in the United States - Harvard UniversityGypsy Violins Hungarian Slovak Gypsies in America, 2012 by Steve Piskor Gypsy Fires in America p. 214 by Irving Brown, 1924 - Irving Brown writes about Braddock, Pa GypsiesRaggle-Taggle: Adventures with a Fiddle in Hungary and Romania by Walter Starkie, 1933 -  Starkie writes about him, John Brencas and Imre Magyari in Budapest. 
The Gypsy in a Non-Gypsy Economy Erdmann Doane Beynon American Journal of Sociology, Vol. 42, No. 3 (Nov., 1936), pp. 358–370, Gypsies of Delray, MIThe Subject of Index to Periodicals volume 1915The Journal of American Folklore, Endre De Spur, 1958, Gypsies of Braddock, PA.The Survey by the Charity Organization Society of the city of New York reference to Gypsies of Braddock, PaThe Canadian Journal of Economics and Political Science reference to Gypsies of Braddock, Pa  The Encyclopædia Britannica, 1956 - Braddock, PaThe Hammered Dulcimer'' by Paul Gifford 
Gypsies in the United States. Smithsonian Education
Arrival of Gypsies in America. Gypsyjib.wetpaint.com
Gypsy Immigration Encyclopedia of North American Immigration. Facts on File. 2005.
Emery Deutsch - Violinist and Songwriter. New York Times, 20 April 1997
Gypsy and Traveler Culture in America. Gypsy Lore Society
What US musical tradition can teach us about roma culture. George Soros Foundation
Author-records romany music culture. Pittsburgh Post-Gazette September 8, 2012
Encyclopida of Cleveland History: Gypsies
Professor Steve Balkin, University of Illinois, Roma Page, links to many Roma sites, videos, and music.

 
Romani in the United States
European-American society
Hungarian-American history
Slovak-American history